This is a list of towns and cities in Scotland with a population of more than 15,000, ordered by population, as defined and compiled by the National Records of Scotland organisation. Glasgow is the largest city in Scotland by both area and population, whilst the capital city, Edinburgh, is the second largest by population and area. The city of Stirling has the smallest population amongst Scotland's cities, with an estimate population of just over 37,000 inhabitants. In total, Scotland consists of eight cities, with multiple larger towns, the largest town being Paisley. 

This article is divided into two sections. The first section of this article ("Localities") contains a list of basic populated areas ordered by population. The second section of this article ("Settlements") is a list of populated urban areas, some of which are composed of more than one locality, and which may span across the boundaries of more than one council area.

All localities are either settlements, themselves, or contained within larger settlements. As of 2020, there are 656 localities in Scotland, and 514 settlements (i.e. 142 of the localities combine as elements of larger settlements).

Localities
In Scotland, locality refers to a populated area composed of contiguous postcodes with populations of at least 500. The 52 localities with a population over 15,000 are listed below.

Settlements
In Scotland, settlement refers to a "collection of contiguous high density postcodes bounded by low density postcodes whose population was 500 or more". For example, the area of Ayr includes the adjoining localities of Ayr and Prestwick. However, most settlements coincide to a single locality. The 44 settlements with a population over 15,000 are listed below.

See also
Local government in Scotland
Subdivisions of Scotland

References

Towns and cities by population
Population
Towns And Cities by Population
2001 United Kingdom census
Population
United Kingdom lists by population
Scotland
Lists of cities by population